Midnight Radio is the second studio album by Big Head Todd and the Monsters that was released in 1990.

The album was released on the band's own label, Big Records, which released their debut album Another Mayberry. Artwork for the album was created by Chris Mars of The Replacements. Songs from the album, including an earlier version of their hit "Bittersweet", were recorded at live shows, sound checks, and basement jam sessions.

After the success of Sister Sweetly, Warner Bros. Records re-released Midnight Radio in 1994.

Track listing 
All songs written by Todd Park Mohr
"Vincent of Jersey" – 1:13  
"The Leaving Song" – 4:26 
"Dinner with Ivan" – 4:34 
"Bittersweet" – 6:14 
"The Moose Song" – 6:18 
"Cold Blooded" – 1:49 
"Soul Children" – 4:35 
"Love Betsy" – 6:03
"Midnight Radio" – 6:01 
"City on Fire" – 3:42
"Monument in Green" – 7:07
"Ann Arbor Grandfather" – 3:58
"Elvis" – 6:53
"Untitled" – 0:31

Personnel
 Todd Park Mohr – guitar, harmonica, vocals
 Rob Squires – bass guitar, background vocals
 Brian Nevin – drums, percussion, background vocals

Production
 Andy Torri – engineer, producer
 John Burns – producer
 John Burris – engineer, producer
 Chris Mars – artwork

References 

1990 albums
Big Head Todd and the Monsters albums